Lake Seydozero is located on the Kola Peninsula, in Murmansk Oblast within the Lake Lovozero and ensures runoff to the river Seydyavryok. "Seyd" in the translation from the Sami language means "sacred", in estonian travel soyda. Murmansk region have 3 Seydlakes

The lake is located at an altitude of 189 m above sea level. The length of the Seydozero is 8 km, the width is from 1.5 to 2.5 km.

Seydozero
LSeydozero